is a female Japanese shōjo manga artist. Her work has been serialized in Kodansha's Nakayoshi magazine, except for her last manga which ran in KC Deluxe.

Her manga Channel W has been published in Spain by Planeta DeAgostini.

List of works

RSR or R-S-Revolution: 1 volume
: 6 volumes, 1999–2002
Kami-sama ga Kureta Natsu: 1 volume, 2002
Channel W: 1 volume, 2003
: 5 volumes, 2004 It won the 2009 Kodansha Manga Award for children's manga.

References

Shōjo manga
Living people
Year of birth missing (living people)